Valleyfair is a  amusement park in Shakopee, Minnesota, United States. Owned by Cedar Fair, the park opened in 1976 and now features over 75 rides and attractions including eight roller coasters. Valleyfair also has a water park called Soak City which is included with the price of admission. Cedar Point and Valleyfair were the first two parks in the Cedar Fair chain (although Cedar Point Amusement Park originally opened in 1870) and a combination of the park names – "cedar" and "fair" – were used to name the company.

History

The carousel in the park came from Excelsior Amusement Park which was closed in 1973. It is the oldest ride in the park. In 1978 in an effort to increase investment capital for continued park expansion, Valleyfair was acquired by Cedar Point in Sandusky, Ohio. Five years later, Cedar Fair Limited Partnership was formed as the parent company for Cedar Point and Valleyfair (the name being derived from the names of both flagship properties). The park continues to grow every year with new rides and attractions.

A height restriction was imposed in 2000 with the building of Power Tower. After negotiations with the FAA and the nearby Flying Cloud Airport, the FAA restricted the building height of Power Tower at  due to its proximity to the airport.

Valleyfair did not open for the 2020 season because of the COVID-19 pandemic in the United States, although it is reopened for the 2021 season.

As the park is located on the banks of the Minnesota River, flooding can become an issue during the springtime months before the park usually opens (or when the park is open for the season), notably in 1988, 1993, 1997, 2014, 2018, and 2019.  Excalibur and Thunder Canyon are built outside of a pre-existing river dike, and were built with this flooding potential in mind.

Attraction timeline

 1976: Valleyfair opens with Antique Cars, Bumper Cars, Carousel, Ferris Wheel, Flying Scooters, High Roller, Scrambler, SuperCat, and Wheel of Fortune
 1977: Monster, Tilt-A-Whirl and Giant Tilt Ride (The only Super Tilt Model 14-car Tilt-A-Whirl ever built by Sellner Manufacturing) open
 1978: Ye Olde Log Flume opens
 1979: Enterprise, Kiddie Ferris Wheel and Wild Rails open

 1980: Corkscrew opens
 1981: Tot Town opens
 1982: Pepsi IMAX theater opens, New entrance marquee
 1983: Three water slides (now known as Panic Falls Body Slides) open
 1985: The Looping Starship and Bayern Curve open
 1987: Thunder Canyon opens
 1988: Two water slides (now known as Panic Falls Speed Slides) and Half Pint Park open
 1989: Excalibur opens

 1990: Minnesota River Valley Railroad opens
 1991: Phase one of Challenge Park opens
 1992: The Wave opens and two 18-hole golf courses added to Challenge Park
 1993: Whitewater Country water park expansion; Bumper Boats added to Challenge Park
 1994: Berenstain Bear Country opens
 1995: Hydroblaster opens
 1996: Wild Thing opens; RipCord added to Challenge Park
 1997: Chaos opens
 1998: Galaxy Theater opens
 1999: Mad Mouse opens

 2000: Power Tower and Frog Hopper open
 2003: Steel Venom opens
 2004: Foam Ball Factory and The Rockin' Tug added to KidWorks
 2005: RipTide and Skyscraper open
 2006: Xtreme Swing opens and Halloween Haunt occurs for the first time.
 2007: Renegade opens
 2008: Halloween Haunt is renamed Halloween Haunt at ValleyScare
 2009: Re-theme of the water park to Soak City

 2011: Planet Snoopy opens
 2012: Fast Lane; Antique Cars closes
 2013: Dinosaurs Alive!
 2014: Route 76: Northern Lights opens, Scrambler and Tilt-A-Whirl relocated and Antique Cars to be re-added as Antique Autos; Pepsi IMAX theater and hydroblaster closes
 2015: Soak City: New Slide Tower, New Children's Splash Pad; Subway relocated, Airbrush Tattoo stand closed 
2016: Flying Eagles, All Wheels Extreme (Upgraded Amphitheater), New High Roller Trains, Subway Takes Place of Ben and Jerrys, 40th Anniversary Events, Enterprise closes
2017: North Star, a Funtime Starflyer swing ride, opens for 2017, New Caribou plaza
2018: Delirious, Larson International super loop, RipTide closes, New light package for Route 76, Snoopy’s bounce house is removed, Free WiFi throughout the park.
2019: Superior Stage opens to host Peanuts Celebration, Updated Bathrooms, Variety of new food options, Dinosaurs Alive! and Looping Starship close.

 2021: Grand Carnivale, a new event, launches in the park. ValleyScare occurs for the last time.
 2022: TRICKS AND TREATS, a new event, launches in the park.

Attractions

Roller coasters

Thrill rides

Family rides

Water rides
These are the water rides besides those in the Soak City.

Kids Rides
Planet Snoopy is a kids area within the park created for the 2011 season as part of a $9 million expansion.

Route 76

"The Route 76 area takes guests back into amusement park Americana" with the reopening of three classic rides that made their debut in the opening of Valleyfair in 1976. These rides include the Antique Autos, which was formerly deconstructed to make room for the construction of Dinosaurs Alive!, the Tilt-a-Whirl, and the Scrambler. A new ride titled 'Northern Lights' will be the main attraction of the area, featuring a ride track over 300 feet in length and 42 feet in height. This family-oriented ride reaches speeds upwards of 43 miles per hour and resembles the Aurora Borealis at night with colored lights in shades of greens, blues, and purples. The Route 76 area features a full service catering and picnic area, titled Picnic Point. Route 76 is located in the front of the park near Steel Venom, and opened on May 16, 2014.

Soak City

Soak City is a water park included with the price of admission to Valleyfair. Rides include a lazy river, a wave pool, and water slides. Newly added slides such as "Breakers Plunge" were added as part of the 2015 Waterpark expansion.

Fast Lane

Fast Lane is Valleyfair's virtual queue system. For an additional charge, visitors get a wrist band that enables them to get to the front of the line on the most popular attractions without queuing including attractions like Wild Thing, Renegade, Steel Venom and Xtreme Swing.

Shows

Valleyfair hosts several performance venues with a wide variety of live entertainment at no additional charge.
The Amphitheater is a large outdoor venue that has hosted country music tribute shows, battle of the bands competitions, acrobats, and even a dog show. In 2016, the Amphitheater was remodeled and began hosting a new show, All Wheel's Extreme.
The Galaxy Theater is an indoor theater. Originally, it was used to stage musical revues, but in recent years, The Galaxy has played host to various comedy and magic acts, such as Rudy Coby, Ed Alonzo, Chipper Lowell, and All-Star Stunt Dogs. Galaxy Theater has remained closed to the public since 2020, due to the COVID-19 Pandemic.
The Gazebo Stage is an outdoor stage with a covered bandstand which presents a musical revue of classic and contemporary hits. The Gazebo features a 7-piece live band (keyboard, bass, guitar, drums, and vocals). 
Benchwarmers is a roaming brass band that strolls throughout the park and plays many classic songs as well as some more contemporary music. Some songs from previous years have been, "Thriller" and "Sweet Caroline".
PEANUTS Showplace is an outdoor venue that is next to the PEANUTS Playhouse in Planet Snoopy. It features stadium bench seating.
The Vocal Coasters are a 6 piece vocal group that performs mainly acapella with a beat-boxing background.

At the Halloween Haunt, there are special themed shows at PEANUTS Showplace, performing Halloween and spooky-themed songs for the trick-or-treaters on the nearby Trick-or-Treat Trail. Recent past years on the Gazebo there has been a show called Haunted Homecoming. On the walkways, there has been a roaming a cappella group (much like The Acafellas), called The Skele-Tones. At night, there is also Haunt Entertainment, most notably world record holding escape artist, Jonathon Bryce performed his Buried Alive in Full View nightly.  Gazebo Stage and PEANUTS Showplace change every season or two, but as of 2018, Sinister Circus, an acrobat circus show, has been located in the Galaxy Theater.

Former rides and attractions
 Berenstain Bear Country (1994–2003) – A themed children's area with a variety of indoor and outdoor attractions covering one acre. According to a press release from Valleyfair, it "features several different theme areas, each from the storybooks. Included is a 32-foot-tall walk-in treehouse with three levels...there also will be the Spooky Old Tree.” Berenstain Bear Country also featured a miniature railroad, playground structures, and a large sandbox.
 KidWorks (2004–2010) – A re-themed children's area located on the same site as Berenstain Bear Country. It added the Foam Ball Factory and Rockin' Tug to the area, both of which still remain in the park today. It also featured the addition of a small hedge maze and a Koi pond. The park's former mascot, Colonel Ohoompapa, would make regular appearances in the area. KidWorks was revamped as a part of the Planet Snoopy expansion in 2011, which saw the removal of the hedge maze, Kidworks Railway, and other remnants of Berenstain Bear Country that still remained.
 Half Pint Park (1988–2010)  – A children's area located near the entrance of High Roller. The area featured several attractions that have been removed, including the Lil' Guppy, Rub-a-Dub Tubs, Busy Boats, a climbing area, and the Kiddie Train. The area was also home to an upcharge bungee trampoline attraction called Xtreme Trampoline in 2005. Half Pint Park was revamped as a part of the Planet Snoopy expansion in 2011.
 Corkscrew TotSpot (–2010) – A set of three rides for small children located between The Wave and the entrance to Corkscrew, including Kiddie U-Turn, Kiddie Carousel, and Moon Buggies. The Corkscrew TotSpot was removed in 2010 as a part of the Planet Snoopy expansion in 2011.
 Northern Lights (1986-2005) – A Chance Rides Falling Star ride with a space theme, removed in 2005 to make room for Xtreme Swing.
 Bayern Curve (1985–1997) – A Schwarzkopf Bayern Kurve ride, located next to Northwoods Grill, replaced with numerous attractions over the years, with Wheel of Fortune currently residing on its former site.
Wild Rails (1979-1998) – Schwarzkopf WildCat coaster, replaced in 1999 with Mad Mouse. Moved to Jolly Roger Amusement Park in Maryland under the name Wildcat.
 SkyScraper (2005–2007) – A Gravity Works SkyScraper ride located near the front of the park within Wild Thing's figure-eight turnaround. It originally operated at Dorney Park & Wildwater Kingdom from 2000–2004, and was eventually relocated to Cedar Point where it operated from 2008–2015. SkyScraper was an upcharge attraction.
 Tot Town (1981–1999) –  A themed area featuring rides, a jungle gym and ball pit designed for small children. It was accessed via a suspension bridge that crossed over the park's central lagoon. Tot Town was removed in 1999 to make room for Power Tower, which reuses the suspension bridge for its ride entrance.
 The Flume (1979–2008) – Known as Ye Olde Log Flume until the early 1990s, the Flume was a log flume ride. The Flume was permanently closed and dismantled at the end of the 2008 season. Soak City waterpark (previously Whitewater Country waterpark) was extended in place of the Flume to accommodate the installation of Breakers Bay, a wave pool attraction.
 Bumper Boats (1993–2010) – An upcharge Bumper boats ride, a part of the Challenge Park located near the front of Valleyfair. The Bumper Boats closed in 2009 and were removed in 2010. This ride was relocated to Michigan's Adventure.
 Mild Thing (1976–2010) – A children's roller coaster, originally called Mine Train and Kiddie Coaster prior to the park's addition of Wild Thing, located in Half Pint Park. Mild Thing closed in 2010 as part of Valleyfair's revamping of the children's area into Planet Snoopy, and was replaced by Cosmic Coaster.
 Chaos (1997–2010) – A Chance Rides Chaos ride, which starts spinning in a horizontal position and gradually lifts into a vertical position. Each individual ride unit flips 360 degrees on its own axis. Chaos was removed prior to the 2011 season.
 Skipper and Dolly Dolphin Show (1977? – late 1980s) – A dolphin show featuring two Bottlenose dolphins named Skipper and Dolly. Given that the dolphins could not be properly housed there during the frigid Minnesota winter months and that various other amusement parks had their own "Skipper and Dolly" dolphin shows (such as Pontchartrain Beach and Six Flags AstroWorld), it can be assumed the two animals were transferred from location to location, depending on whichever parks wanted to incorporate the dolphins into their summertime show schedules.
 Adventure Golf (1992–2012) – Two upcharge 18-hole mini-golf courses, a part of the Challenge Park located near the front of Valleyfair. Its last operating season was 2011, and it was closed to the public during the 2012 season. The area was replaced with Valleyfair's catered event area, named Picnic Point.
 Antique Cars (1976–2012) – A 1148 ft track featuring self-controlled, gas-powered replicas of 1910 Cadillac Touring Cars. It was removed to build Dinosaurs Alive! It has returned in a different format in the new Route 76 area.
 Go-Karts (1991–2013) – A quarter mile go-kart race track located in the Challenge Park. The Go-Karts were an upcharge attraction. The area was replaced with the Antique Autos ride as a part of the Route 76 expansion in 2014.
 Pepsi IMAX Theater (1982-2013) – An indoor theater building located near Mad Mouse which featured several daily showings of IMAX films. The film being shown in the theater changed from season to season. The theater was demolished to make way for Barefoot Beach in 2015.
 Hydroblaster (1995–2013) – Two dark dinghy slides near Planet Snoopy. The area was replaced with the addition of Breakers Plunge and Breakers Pipeline to Soak City in 2015.
 Enterprise (1979–2016) – A HUSS Enterprise type ride. Closed in 2016 to make room for North Star.
 RipTide (2005–2017) – A HUSS  Top Spin ride where riders get sprayed by a fountain during the ride. Closed prior to the 2018 season.
 Snoopy's Moon Bounce (2011–2017) – A bounce house attraction located in Planet Snoopy which featured a large inflatable Snoopy dressed as an astronaut. It was removed prior to the 2018 season.
 Dinosaurs Alive! (2013-2019) – An upcharge walkthrough attraction where you could see dinosaur animatronics along a trail. It closed at end of 2019 season.
 Looping Starship (1985–2019) – An Intamin Looping Starship ride where riders would gain momentum and spin upside down in a pirate themed ship. The ride closed at end of 2019 season.

Former Halloween Haunt at ValleySCARE

The Halloween Haunt was a former Halloween event at Valleyfair that was originally known as HalloWeekends, which operated from 1998 to 2000 on weekends in September. The name was changed to Halloween Haunt when the event was brought back six years later in 2006. The Great Pumpkin Fest is a family-friendly Halloween event open during the day, while the park is under normal operation. At night, the Halloween Haunt would take over and featured haunted houses, outdoor mazes, scare zones, and live entertainment. Many rides remained in operation during the event, though some were closed to accommodate the transition. Valleyfair announced that the Halloween Haunt would not return for the 2022 operating season on February 25, 2022.

Former haunted attractions

Tricks and Treats
Planet Spooky was added to the ValleySCARE lineup in 2011 with the parks addition of Planet Snoopy. However daytime family-friendly activities were present prior to the Planet Spooky name. In 2015 it was renamed to The Great Pumpkin Fest. In 2022, the family-friendly Halloween event was renamed again to "Tricks and Treats".

Incidents
 On the evening of September 22, 2018, police were forced to close the “ValleySCARE” event early after a large number of fights broke out. At least three people were cited for offences. Multiple police departments along with a police helicopter assisted with evacuating the park along with Valleyfair security personnel.
 On May 25, 2017, Numerous fights broke out during Valleyfair’s first ever “Adult Night,” a kid-free event for adults. Fights took place mostly in the parking lot but some fights did occur in the park. Nobody was injured. One person was cited for disorderly conduct.
 On November 21, 2015, a fire was started at a storage building (haunt attraction London Terror). 25% of the structure was damaged, the cause of the fire is unknown. Fabric Ceiling needed replacing. No injuries reported.
 On September 20, 2012, an employee became trapped under a carriage from Power Tower after it fell while he was performing maintenance on the ride. The 41-year-old operator sued the manufacturer, S&S - Sansei Technologies.
 On June 16, 2011, the ride Minnesota River Valley Railroad derailed near the amphitheater at the front of the park and careened into the south train station platform. Two passenger cars left the tracks and were later placed back on the tracks by park maintenance. No injuries were reported.
 On August 5, 2010, a chlorine leak from the Soak City Waterpark sent 26 people to the hospital.
 On September 3, 2007, the ride Xtreme Swing experienced a fire in an electrical junction box.  There were no injuries, and the ride reopened several days later after the problem was fixed and the ride successfully tested.
 On May 21, 2006, the rear car of a roller coaster train on Wild Thing detached from the middle car during the final brake run. 18 people were injured and 14 were taken to a local hospital, though most injuries were considered minor. An investigation later determined that a mounting bracket in the brake system failed, and the ride resumed operation on June 1, 2006.

Popular culture
 Valleyfair appeared in a scene in the baseball film Little Big League, with rides such as Corkscrew, Enterprise, High Roller, and The Wave being visible in the scene.
 Yam Haus, a Minneapolis Pop band, made a song called “The Thrill” in May of 2019. The music video was filmed at Valleyfair. In the video, there are rides and attractions such as Wild Thing, Power Tower, Antique Autos, Corkscrew, North Star, High Roller, Extreme Extreme Swing, Route 76 area at night, the Midway Games area, the Cotton Candy stand, & the 3pt basketball challenge.

See also

 Excelsior Amusement Park – a park that operated in the region from 1925 to 1973. The carousel that stands inside the entrance came from Excelsior Amusement Park.
Minnesota River

References

External links

 Valleyfair Official Website
 

 
Amusement parks in Minnesota
Cedar Fair amusement parks
1976 establishments in Minnesota
Buildings and structures in Scott County, Minnesota
Tourist attractions in Scott County, Minnesota
Amusement parks opened in 1976